The California State Normal School was a teaching college system founded on May 2, 1862, eventually evolving into San José State University in San Jose and the University of California, Los Angeles in Los Angeles.

History
The school was created when the State of California took over a normal school that educated San Francisco teachers in association with that city's high school system. This school was founded in 1857 and was generally known as either the San Francisco Normal School or Minns Evening Normal School.

Although the California legislative act founding the school referred to the institution as the "Normal School of the State of California," the institution was commonly referred to as the California State Normal School. The 1870 Act that moved the school to San Jose formalized the California State Normal School name. However sometimes it was referred to as San Jose State Normal School or State Normal School at San Jose.

In 1871, the school moved to Washington Square Park at Fourth and San Carlos Streets in San Jose, where San José State University is still located. The original building at Washington Square Park was completed in 1872 but burned down on February 10, 1880. It was replaced by a second building in 1881, depicted in the lithograph at right.

In 1881, a southern branch campus was announced in Los Angeles, which in 1919 became part of the newly established southern branch of the  University of California. In 1887, the California legislature changed the name of the two normal schools, dropping the word "California" and designating them simply as "State Normal Schools." By the end of the 19th century, the State Normal School in San Jose was graduating roughly 130 teachers a year and was "one of the best known normal schools in the West."

The original campus later became San Jose State University, the founding institution of the California State University system.

Other campuses 
Other State Normal Schools were established in Chico in 1887, San Diego in 1897, and elsewhere throughout the state of California. With the exception of the Los Angeles campus, the system of State Normal Schools would later become the California State University system.

In 1919, the California State Legislature established the southern branch of the University of California and in so doing, transferred the campus of the State Normal School at Los Angeles to the new university branch. Students at the State Normal School became students of the new southern branch, which over time evolved into what is today the UCLA Department of Education.

In 1921 the California State Legislature decreed that the remaining State Normal Schools would be known as State Teachers Colleges and that the original campus would be known as the State Teachers College at San Jose. In 1935, the State Teachers Colleges became the California State Colleges, administered from the State Department of Education in Sacramento. The new San Jose State College was no longer limited to educating teachers and later evolved into San José State University.

Athletics 
After 1887 the official name of the San Jose campus was the "State Normal School at San Jose." The school's athletic teams initially played under the "Normal" identity as indicated in the 1910 football team photo on this page, but they gradually shifted to the State Normal School identity, as evidenced by images of the SNS football and basketball squads from this era. Despite the SNS identity, the school continued to be referred to as the "California State Normal School, San Jose" in official publications like the 1919 school bulletin pictured on this page. Historical archives in the Martin Luther King, Jr. Library on the San Jose State campus include a number of pieces of State Normal School memorabilia, including a "SNS" pennant.

Gallery

Notes

References
 Act to Establish and Maintain a State Normal School (May 2, 1862), The Statutes of California, pp. 472–473, Benj. P. Avery, State Printer, Sacramento, 1862.
 Historical Sketch of the State Normal School at San Jose - 1862 - 1889, State Office, Supt. of State Printing, 1889.
 Act Providing for the Selection of a Site for and Construction of the California State Normal School
 Washington Square 1857-1979: The History of San Jose State University, Gilbert & Burdick, San Jose State University, 1979.

Universities and colleges in Los Angeles County, California
Universities and colleges in Santa Clara County, California
California State University
Educational institutions established in 1862
1862 establishments in California